Colombi is a surname. Notable people with the surname include:

Arturo Colombi (born 1958), Argentine Radical Civic Union (UCR) politician and former governor of Corrientes Province
Dario Colombi (born 1929), Italian bobsledder
Matteo Colombi (born 1994), Italian footballer
Giuseppe Colombi (1635–1694), Italian musician and composer
Henry Colombi (born 1999), American football quarterback
Ricardo Colombi (born 1957), Argentine lawyer and politician elected Governor of Corrientes Province
Simone Colombi (born 1991), Italian footballer
Marchesa Colombi, pen name of Maria Antonietta Torriani
Matteo Colombi (born 1994), Italian footballer
Myriam Colombi (1940–2021), French film, television and stage actress
Nicole Colombi (born 1995), Italian racewalker
Ricardo Colombi (born 1957), Argentine lawyer and politician
Simone Colombi (born 1991), Italian professional footballer